Starlight Hotel is a 1987 New Zealand Depression-era drama film.

Synopsis
During the Great Depression era of the 1930s on New Zealand's South Island, two outcasts, one of them a 13-year-old in search of her father, link up and become friends.

Cast

Reception
 Variety, reviewing the film after viewing it at the Cannes Film Festival, found "the film benefits tremendously from the charismatic performances of the leads" and called it "a very appealing pic."
 TV Guide described Starlight Hotel as "Beautifully photographed...Had [the actors'] performances been weaker, the story might easily have been lost in the gorgeous photography of the magnificent New Zealand countryside...even though they realized it would require considerable extra expense, Mirage decided the incredible natural beauty of the South Island would immeasurably enhance the film, and they shot the entire film there."
 Best Family Videos gave it an A- quality rating and recommended it for teens to adults.

References

External links

Starlight Hotel (1987) press kit

1987 films
1980s New Zealand films
1980s English-language films
Films shot in New Zealand
Films set in New Zealand